A seborrheic keratosis is a non-cancerous (benign) skin tumour that originates from cells, namely keratinocytes, in the outer layer of the skin called the epidermis. Like liver spots, seborrheic keratoses are seen more often as people age.

The tumours (also called lesions) appear in various colours, from light tan to black. They are often associated with other skin conditions, including basal cell carcinoma. Rarely seborrheic keratosis and basal cell carcinoma occur at the same location. At clinical examination the differential diagnosis include a wart and melanoma. Because only the top layers of the epidermis are involved, seborrheic keratoses are often described as having a "pasted on" appearance. Some dermatologists refer to seborrheic keratoses as "seborrheic warts", because they resemble warts, but strictly speaking the term "warts" refers to lesions that are caused by the human papillomavirus.

Cause
The cause of seborrheic keratosis is not known. The only definitive association is that its prevalence increases with age.

Diagnosis

Visual diagnosis is made by the "stuck on" appearance, horny pearls or cysts embedded in the structure. Darkly pigmented lesions can be challenging to distinguish from nodular melanomas. Furthermore, thin seborrheic keratoses on facial skin can be very difficult to differentiate from lentigo maligna even with dermatoscopy. Clinically, epidermal nevi are similar to seborrheic keratoses in appearance.  Epidermal nevi are usually present at or near birth. Condylomas and warts can clinically resemble seborrheic keratoses, and dermatoscopy can be helpful to differentiate them. On the penis and genital skin, condylomas and seborrheic keratoses can be difficult to differentiate, even on biopsy.

A study examining over 4,000 biopsied skin lesions identified clinically as seborrheic keratoses showed 3.1% were malignancies. Two thirds of those were squamous cell carcinoma. To date, the gold standard in the diagnosis of seborrheic keratosis is represented by the histolopathologic analysis of a skin biopsy.

Subtypes
Seborrheic keratoses may be divided into the following types:

Differential diagnoses
Dermatosis papulosa nigra (DPN) is a condition of many small, benign skin lesions on the face, a condition generally presenting on dark-skinned individuals. DPN is extremely common, affecting up to 30% of black people in the United States.

Treatment
No treatment of seborrheic keratoses is necessary, except for cosmetic reasons. Generally, lesions can be treated with electrodesiccation and curettage, or cryosurgery. When correctly performed, removal of seborrheic keratoses will not cause much visible scarring.

Epidemiology
Seborrheic keratosis is the most common benign skin tumor. Incidence increases with age. There is less prevalence in people with darker skin. In large-cohort studies, all patients aged 50 and older had at least one seborrheic keratosis. Onset is usually in middle age, although they are common in younger patients too—found in 12% of 15-year-olds to 25-year-olds—making the term "senile keratosis" a misnomer.

See also 
 The sign of Leser-Trélat

Notes

References

External links 

Epidermal nevi, neoplasms, and cysts
Dermal and subcutaneous growths